Silampari Airport  is an airport located in Lubuklinggau, South Sumatra, Indonesia.

Silampari Airport was originally a pioneering airport and began operation on May 7, 1994. It was inaugurated by the Governor of South Sumatra, Ramli Hasan Basri and the Minister of Transportation, Haryanto Danutirto.

The airport serves flights only Silampari-Palembang route with Cassa aircraft with a capacity of 19 passengers. 

Due to limited operational funds, the airport was closed between 2001 and 2004. Beginning in January 2005, the airport re-operated with subsidies from the Government of Musi Rawas. 

At the end of May 2015, Nam Air, a subsidiary of Sriwijaya Air, initialized its direct flight to Jakarta with Boeing 737-500. Sriwijaya Air and Nam Air both are medium-service airlines with longer seat pitch, food and beverage, and used one ticket for both airlines.

Airlines and destinations

Passenger

Statistics

References

External links
  Dirjen Perhubungan Udara

Airports in South Sumatra